The men's 86 kg freestyle wrestling competition at the 2018 Commonwealth Games in Gold Coast, Australia was held on 14 April at the Carrara Sports and Leisure Centre.

Results
Legend
F — Won by fall

Bracket

Repechage

References

Wrestling at the 2018 Commonwealth Games